Valoniopsis is a genus of green algae in the family Valoniaceae.

References

External links

Cladophorales genera
Cladophorales